Bariza Khiari (born 3 September 1946) is a member of the Senate of France, representing the city of Paris.  She was a member of the Socialist Party and moved to La République En Marche in 2017.  She is married and has three children. She has also been a knight of the French National Order of Merit since 2001.

She received her diploma in advanced studies and a Master of Business Administration from the Institut d'administration des entreprises of the University of Paris in 1981.

At the professional level Bariza Khiari was, until March 2004, regional delegate for tourism in the Île-de-France and a departmental delegate of national education from Paris.

External links
 Page on the Senate website
 Bariza Khiari's blog

1946 births
Living people
French Senators of the Fifth Republic
Chevaliers of the Légion d'honneur
Knights of the Ordre national du Mérite
Socialist Party (France) politicians
Algerian emigrants to France
Naturalized citizens of France
Women members of the Senate (France)
La République En Marche! politicians
Senators of Paris
Pantheon-Sorbonne University alumni
French Democratic Confederation of Labour members
21st-century French women